Ekow is a given name. Notable people with the name include:

Ekow Benson (born 1989), Ghanaian footballer
Ekow Duker, South African novelist
Ekow Eshun (born 1968), Ghanaian-British writer, journalist and broadcaster
Alfred Ekow Gyan, Ghanaian politician
Ekow Mensah, Ghanaian social entrepreneur and speaker
Ekow Yankah, African American legal professor